Joseph Cramarossa  (born October 26, 1992) is a Canadian professional ice hockey forward for Adler Mannheim of the Deutsche Eishockey Liga (DEL).

Playing career
As a youth, Cramarossa played in the 2005 Quebec International Pee-Wee Hockey Tournament with the Markham Waxers minor ice hockey team. He later played with the Markham Majors.

Cramarossa played junior ice hockey with the Markham Waxers of the Ontario Junior Hockey League, before he was selected 49th overall in the 2008 OHL Priority Selection by the Mississauga St. Michael's Majors. In his first Major junior season in 2009–10 with the Majors he finished with 16 points in 64 games. He was later selected by the Anaheim Ducks in the third round, 65th overall, in the 2011 NHL Entry Draft.

On March 2, 2013, he was signed by the Ducks to a three-year, entry-level contract. He made his professional debut in the 2013–14 season, after he was assigned by the Ducks to AHL affiliate, the Norfolk Admirals. In 47 games with the Admirals, Cramarossa contributed with 4 points as a rookie.

In 2015–16 season, Cramarossa recorded professional highs with 11 goals and 17 points in 61 games with Ducks inaugural affiliate, the San Diego Gulls. Following the conclusion of his entry-level deal with the Ducks, Cramarossa was re-signed to a one-year extension as a restricted free agent on June 24, 2016.

Cramarossa built upon his previous successful season by impressing returning coach Randy Carlyle in the Ducks training camp and pre-season to be named on Anaheim's opening night roster for the 2016–17 season. He was soon returned on loan to the Gulls without featuring with the Ducks, on October 14, 2016. Having made his season debut with the Gulls, Cramarossa received his first NHL recall on October 22, 2016. He made his NHL debut in the Ducks home opener, in a 4–2 victory over the Vancouver Canucks on October 23, 2016. Cramarossa scored his first NHL goal in a 4–0 win over the Los Angeles Kings on November 1, 2016.

After 10 points in 49 games with the Ducks, he was claimed off waivers by the Vancouver Canucks on March 1, 2017. He played 10 games with the Canucks, scoring no points, before blocking a shot in a game against the Chicago Blackhawks on March 21 and suffering a season-ending foot injury.

On September 11, 2017, the Calgary Flames signed Cramarossa to a professional tryout to attend training camp. He was later released by the Flames on September 27, 2017, but signed an AHL contract with the Stockton Heat, the Flames' AHL affiliate, the next day. On February 14, 2018, Cramarossa was traded by the Heat to the Wilkes-Barre/Scranton Penguins in exchange for Colin Smith.

On July 12, 2018, the Penguins re-signed Cramarossa to a one-year extension. On February 20, 2019, the Pittsburgh Penguins signed Cramarossa to a two-way contract for the remainder of the 2018–19 season. Cramarossa spent the entirety of the season in Wilkes-Barre/Scranton, recording 16 points in 56 games.

On April 27, 2019, the Penguins re-signed Cramarossa to a one-year, two-way contract for the 2019–20 season. Cramarossa played in nine games with Wilkes-Barre, before he was traded by the Penguins to the Chicago Blackhawks in exchange for Graham Knott on November 20, 2019. He was directly assigned to the Blackhawks' AHL affiliate, the Rockford IceHogs.

As a free agent from his contract with the Blackhawks, Cramarossa was signed to a one-year, two-way contract with the Minnesota Wild on October 9, 2020.

Entering his third season within the Wild organization and in the final year of his two-year contract, Cramarossa was familiarly assigned to begin the 2022–23 season season with the Iowa Wild. He was later recalled on multiple occasions to Minnesota and featured in four games while adding one goal. On January 12, 2023, Cramarossa was placed on unconditional waivers by the Wild after mutually agreeing to terminate the remainder of his contract in order to take up a European offer. He cleared the following day and was later announced to have signed with German club, Adler Mannheim of the Deutsche Eishockey Liga (DEL), for the remainder of the season.

Career statistics

References

External links
 

1992 births
Living people
Adler Mannheim players
Anaheim Ducks draft picks
Anaheim Ducks players
Belleville Bulls players
Canadian ice hockey centres
Canadian people of Italian descent
Ice hockey people from Ontario
Iowa Wild players
Minnesota Wild players
Mississauga St. Michael's Majors players
Norfolk Admirals players
Rockford IceHogs (AHL) players
San Diego Gulls (AHL) players
Stockton Heat players
Utah Grizzlies (ECHL) players
Vancouver Canucks players
Wilkes-Barre/Scranton Penguins players